Group B of the 1997 Fed Cup Asia/Oceania Zone Group I was one of two pools in the Asia/Oceania Zone Group I of the 1997 Fed Cup. Four teams competed in a round robin competition, with the top two teams and the bottom two teams proceeding to their respective sections of the play-offs: the top teams played for advancement to the World Group Play-offs, while the bottom teams faced potential relegation to Group II.

China vs. Kazakhstan

Hong Kong vs. Thailand

China vs. Hong Kong

Thailand vs. Kazakhstan

China vs. Thailand

Hong Kong vs. Kazakhstan

See also
Fed Cup structure

References

External links
 Fed Cup website

1997 Fed Cup Asia/Oceania Zone